Dr. Rama Sofat Hospital is an infertility hospital in the Ludhiana city of the Indian state of Punjab. It is affiliated with the Indian Medical Association. The hospital was established in 1972 with a 10-bed capacity which later expanded. It was the first hospital in Northern India to provide all the infertility-related treatments.

History
The hospital was established by Dr. Rama Sofat in 1972, offering better facilities and making patients aware of the options for the treatment of infertility, particularly in the lesser-educated and rural areas of Punjab.

Facilities

 Infertility
 Endoscopy
 Male Sexual Dysfunction
 Recurrent Pregnancy Lost
 Aesthetic Gynaecology
 Urogynaecology
 Gynea Cancer Clinic
 Maternity
 Menopausal Clinic
 Paediatric
 Radiology
 Dentistry

See also
Healthcare in India

References

External links 
 

Hospitals in Punjab, India
Ludhiana
Hospitals established in 1972
1972 establishments in Punjab, India